András Németh may refer to:
 András Németh (handball)
 András Németh (footballer)